Gopal Krishna (Child Krishna) is an Indian religious silent film made in 1929. It was directed by V. Shantaram for his newly formed Prabhat Film Company. The film was a "solo debut" for Shantaram, after co-directing Netaji Palkar (1927) with K. Dhaiber for the Maharashtra Film Company. The story was written by Shivram Vashikar and the cast composed of Suresh, Kamaladevi, Anant Apte, Sakribai and G.R. Mane.

The story was about the child (Gopal) Krishna and his fight with King Kamsa of Mathura. Made in the Pre-Independence era, the film was cited as representing the "Gandhian anti-colonial nationalism". Shantaram stated that he had meshed the Puranic story with "topical allusions". The film was a success as was the Talkie remake  Gopal Krishna (1938).

Cast
 Suresh
 Kamaladevi
 Anant Apte
 Sakribai
 G. R. Mane

References

External links

1929 films
Indian silent films
1920s Hindi-language films
Films directed by V. Shantaram
Prabhat Film Company films
Indian black-and-white films